The 1902–03 Yale Bulldogs men's basketball team represented Yale University in intercollegiate basketball during the 1902–03 season. The team finished the season with a 15–1 record and was retroactively named the national champion by the Helms Athletic Foundation.

References

Yale
Yale Bulldogs men's basketball seasons
NCAA Division I men's basketball tournament championship seasons
Yale Bulldogs Men's Basketball Team
Yale Bulldogs Men's Basketball Team